KUSC (91.5 FM) is a listener-supported classical music radio station broadcasting from downtown Los Angeles, California, United States. KUSC is owned and operated by the University of Southern California, which also operates student-run Internet station KXSC (AM) and San Francisco's classical station KDFC. It is the largest non-profit classical music station in the country and one of the two classical music stations in the Greater Los Angeles Area, KUSC and KMZT-AM.

History
The station was one of the first radio stations to operate on the FM band when it officially signed on using the frequency of 91.7 on December 5, 1946.  Its primary benefactor was George Allan Hancock.  It operated out the Hancock Foundation building on the USC campus and broadcast from a 250 foot tower above the building.

In the 1970s the station adopted a general public radio format. On April 2, 1973 new station manager Wally Smith oversaw the return to the all classical station.  In 1976 the station's transmitter was placed on Lookout Mountain in Laurel Canyon, above Hollywood.  In 1993 tower was erected near Mount Wilson.  In 1996 Smith left the station after changing the format to talk, classical, jazz, folk and world music (he would go on to develop WPBB).

In 2010 it moved its broadcast studio to the USC Building in downtown Los Angeles.

In February 2014, public radio station KCRW of Santa Monica announced that it would buy the Santa Barbara Foundation's classical station KDB (FM) 93.7 in Santa Barbara for $1 million. The transaction will allow KCRW to begin using KQSC, USC's current repeater station in Santa Barbara, as a repeater for KCRW's programming, while transferring KUSC's classical programming from KQSC to KDB, thus perpetuating KDB's role as Santa Barbara's classical station. The legacy KDB call letters have been retained. As of 2022, the radio station rebranded; therefore the new name for the channel is Classical California KUSC.

Programming
Notable local programming includes:
 Jennifer Miller and Alan Chapman’s weekday morning shows;
 Dianne Nicolini’s weekday noontime requests program;
 Brian Lauritzen weekday afternoon program;
 Lara Downes’ weekday evening show;
 Jennifer Miller's Sunday opera show, and
 Weekend shows by Chapman, Lauritzen,  Capparela, Miller, Van Driel and Robin Pressman.
 The overnight program Classical California All Night is hosted by Rich Capparela "Monday-Tuesday", John Van Driel "Wednesday-Friday", Brissa Segal "Saturday" and Suraj Partha "Sunday". It is shared with KDFC In San Francisco.

Management helped establish the nationwide Classical 24 network and also supervised Virginia's WMRA network before taking up leadership at KUSC.

The station holds three membership drives annually to help support operational costs.  These drives usually last less than ten days.  Corporate sponsors include Lexus, Miramax Films, University of Redlands, Universal Music Group, City of Hope National Medical Center and Providence Health & Services.

KUSC broadcasts in HD.

KUSC is not related to WUSC, the student-run radio station at the University of South Carolina; the two institutions happen to share initials.

Transmitter network

Notes:

See also
 Abram Chasins – American composer and pianist who helped re-organize KUSC in 1972.

References

External links
FCC History Cards for KUSC
KUSC official website

KCRW buying Santa Barbara classical station KDB

Radio stations of the University of Southern California
Classical music radio stations in the United States
NPR member stations
NPR member networks
Radio stations established in 1946
1946 establishments in California